The 1974 National Soccer League season was the fifty-first season under the National Soccer League (NSL) name. The season began in April and concluded in late October with Toronto Croatia defeating Toronto Homer for the NSL Championship. The regular-season title was clinched by the Serbian White Eagles, and as a result, faced the Challenge Trophy champions Calgary Springer Kickers for the Canadian Open Cup and successfully claimed the title. The NSL Cup was won by Toronto Italia after defeating Toronto First Portuguese.

The league experienced a further increase in match attendance and contributed an instrumental role in the construction of Lamport Stadium. Toronto Croatia became involved with the Toronto Metros to form Toronto Metros-Croatia to compete in the 1975 North American Soccer League season.

Overview 
The membership in the league increased to 19 members with the additions of Toronto Macedonia, and the Quebec Selects. The Selects were a developmental team sponsored by the Quebec government, and Macedonia was another ethnic associated club that represented the Macedonian diaspora in Toronto. The previous time the Macedonian community participated in the NSL was in the 1963 season. The increase in teams prompted the league ownership to partition the league into two separate divisions with a promotion and relegation system for the following season.

The average match attendance increased from the previous season with the Serbian White Eagles and Toronto Homer as the vanguard clubs in match attendance. The match attendance throughout the NSL would range from 10,000 to 400 spectators. The NSL experienced further riots and fan violence which was primarily fueled by ethnic rivalries amongst the ethnically associated clubs. The frequent hooliganism throughout the season caused several referees to refuse to officiate several NSL matches. The league responded by issuing heavier fines, and suspensions to the responsible parties. On the North American Soccer League front the Toronto Metros were experiencing financial difficulties, which resulted in Toronto Croatia becoming an equal financial partner to form Toronto Metros-Croatia.

Teams

Coaching changes

Standings

Playoffs

Finals

Cup  
The cup tournament was a separate contest from the rest of the season in which all nineteen teams took part. The tournament would conclude in a two-legged match final for the Cup.

Finals

Canadian Open Cup  
The Canadian Open Cup was a tournament organized by the National Soccer League in 1971 where the NSL champion would face the Challenge Trophy winners to determine the best team throughout the country. The 1974 edition served as a qualifier match to determine the Canadian representative to the CONCACAF Champions' Cup. Serbian White Eagles were the NSL representative for the 1974 competition while their opponents were Calgary Springer Kickers, who were the Alberta Cup, and Challenge Trophy titleholders.

References

External links
RSSSF CNSL page
thecnsl.com - 1974 season

1974–75 domestic association football leagues
National Soccer League
1974